USS Picket may refer to the following ships of the United States Navy:

 USS Picket, bought 1862, headquarters of General Burnside during the Battle of Roanoke Island.
 , completed 15 April 1942 by Marietta Manufacturing Co., Point Pleasant, West Virginia
 , laid down 28 March 1945 as SS James F. Harrell by J. A. Jones Construction Co., Panama City, Florida

References 

United States Navy ship names